KPCG-LP (101.3 FM) is a low-power FM radio station broadcasting a non-denominational Christian religious format. Licensed to Edmond, Oklahoma, United States, the station serves the Oklahoma City, Oklahoma area. The station is currently licensed to Philadelphia Church of God, Inc. and broadcasts from the campus of Herbert W. Armstrong College.

History
The station was assigned call sign KPCG-LP on February 3, 2015.

References

External links

http://kpcg.fm

PCG-LP
Radio stations established in 2016
2016 establishments in Oklahoma
PCG-LP
Church of God (Armstrong)
Edmond, Oklahoma